Panashe is a given name. Notable people with the name include:

 Panashe Gweme (born 1998), Zimbabwean journalist, essayist, and novelist
 Panashe Muzambe (born 1995), Scottish rugby union player